The Pure Oil Gas Station, located at 65 Spring Street in Saratoga Springs, Saratoga County, New York, is a historic service station. It was built in 1933 by the Pure Oil Co. in the English Cottage style.  It was moved to its present location on Spring Street in 1978 after having been located at 522 Broadway.  It is a one-story, brick building in three sections, measuring 34 feet by 27 feet.  It consists of the main block housing the office with a rear wing and one stall garage.  It features a steeply pitched roof of durable tile.

It was listed on the National Register of Historic Places in 1978.

The building has now been adapted for reuse as a restaurant.

References

External links

Transport infrastructure completed in 1933
Buildings and structures in Saratoga Springs, New York
Gas stations on the National Register of Historic Places in New York (state)
National Register of Historic Places in Saratoga County, New York
Transportation buildings and structures in Saratoga County, New York